Otome (おとめ, オトメ) is a feminine Japanese given name.

Characters
, a character in Pani Poni Dash
, a character in Aikatsu!
, a character in School Days
, a character from Shimoneta
, a character in Nura: Rise of the Yokai Clan

Japanese feminine given names